Seyyed Sharif may refer to:
 Seyyed Sharif, Ahvaz
 Seyyed Sharif (31°18′ N 48°25′ E), Ahvaz
 Seyyed Sharif, Bavi